Epigonichthys is a genus of lancelets belonging to the family Branchiostomatidae.  The genus was first described in 1876 by Wilhelm Peters. The type species is Epigonichthys cultellus.

The species of this genus are found in Central America, Malesia, Australia.

Species:

Epigonichthys australis 
Epigonichthys bassanus 
Epigonichthys cingalensis 
Epigonichthys cultellus 
Epigonichthys hectori 
Epigonichthys maldivensis

References

Cephalochordata
Animals described in 1876
Taxa named by Wilhelm Peters